Richard Dickinson Chambers FRS (16 March 1935 — 18 April 2019) was a British organofluorine chemist. Dick studied chemistry at Durham University and in 1960 joined the chemistry department's faculty. He retired in 2000 but remained in the department as Emeritus Professor for several years.

In 1997 he was elected Fellow of the Royal Society and in 2003 his fluorine research was recognised with the Prix Henri Moissan from the Maison de la Chimie in Paris.

References

Extra reading

1935 births
2019 deaths
Fellows of the Royal Society
People from South Moor
Alumni of University College, Durham
Academics of Durham University